"Lavender (Nightfall Remix)" is a 2017 song by American rapper Snoop Dogg. It is a remixed version of the BadBadNotGood (BBNG) song "Lavender" with lyrics added which addressed the issue of police brutality in the United States. It was released with a music video which caused some controversy because of a scene depicting a mock assassination of U.S. President Donald Trump. The song was included in Snoop's 2017 album Neva Left.

Background
During a video game event in October 2016, the American rapper Snoop Dogg and American YouTuber Jesse Wellens paused for a smoking session. During this time, Wellens proposed a music video with clowns, inspired by the shooting of Philando Castile. Three days later, Snoop sent Wellens his own version of "Lavender" with lyrics referencing police brutality. Wellens later told Billboard, "When I originally wrote the idea of the video, the video of [Philando Castile] getting shot came out online and it was causing riots. We just kind of wanted to bring the clowns out, because it's clownery."

In late October 2016, Snoop previewed his new song regarding police brutality on Instagram, sampling the beat of BBNG's "Lavender". Snoop said the song was meant to be "not controversial but real – real to the voice of the people who don't have a voice."

Music video and release
The song was released on March 12, 2017 with a music video directed by Jesse Wellens and James DeFina. It depicts a world of clowns and "doggs". The beginning of the video shows a clown family and follows the father (played by Michael Rapaport), who smokes weed while stressed. After the father encounters a clown policeman, he is shot dead with a glitter gun while a bystander films the incident. The video cuts to "The Clown House", where Ronald Klump, a clown parody version of Donald Trump, holds a press conference calling for the deportation of all "doggs". In the video, Snoop Dogg sees Klump and his henchmen outside, and he grabs a gun and goes outside to aim it at Klump. When Snoop pulls the trigger, a flag with the word "bang" pops out, and Klump is later seen in chains.

The song was included in Snoop's album Neva Left, released on May 19, 2017.

Controversy
Conservative politicians and commentators criticized the video's mock assassination of Ronald Klump, a parody of Donald Trump. Senator Marco Rubio (R-Florida) said, "We've had presidents assassinated before in this country, so anything like that, people should really be careful about that kind of thing." Senator Ted Cruz (R-Texas) said "I think it really is in poor taste to be making fun of murdering someone. Particularly assassinating the president." On March 15, 2017, President Donald Trump wrote on Twitter, "Can you imagine what the outcry would be if @SnoopDogg, failing career and all, had aimed and fired the gun at President Obama? Jail time!" Trump's lawyer Michael Cohen called the video "totally disgraceful" and called for Snoop to apologize. The U.S. Secret Service told The Wrap that the agency was "aware of" the video. Jesse Wellens later said on the H3 Podcast that the Secret Service interviewed him and Snoop Dogg about the video.

On March 16, Snoop posted a video responding to the controversy, saying, "Now they wanna ask me questions and interview me, but guess what? I've got nothing to say, mate."  Some artists, including T.I. and Talib Kweli, defended Snoop's video. Common compared it to political statements made by Public Enemy and KRS-One. Bow Wow tweeted, "Ayo @realDonaldTrump shut your punk ass up talking shit about my uncle @SnoopDogg before we pimp your wife and make her work for us," and deleted the tweet within 24 hours.  While discussing his reaction to the video's ending, Ice-T said, "I was nervous. He's messing with the line. We'll see how this weighs out, but I roll with Snoop. I thought it was a good video."

Critical reception
The rapper Treach called the video "artistic" and compared its comedy to Saturday Night Live skits. Spencer Kornhaber compared the reactions to the video to remarks made by Madonna at the Women's March on Washington about bombing the White House, arguing that they both show how strong political statements are used by one's political enemies to "portray Trump's critics as wackos." Amy Zimmerman of The Daily Beast wrote that the music video was "noticeably bereft of punchlines" and criticized its depiction of Trump, writing it "isn't amusing...so much as disturbing and deadly." Matthew Dessem, writing for Slate, called the video's execution "not bad" and said the video's clown gags gave it "a lurid effect that actually feels about right for this moment in time."

Charts

See also
 Black Lives Matter
 Insane Clown President
 Make America Crip Again
 2016 clown sightings

References

External links
 Official video on YouTube
 Jesse Wellens describes being interrogated by the Secret Service, H3h3 Productions

2017 singles
BadBadNotGood songs
Snoop Dogg songs
2017 controversies in the United States
Criticism of police brutality
Music video controversies
Parodies of Donald Trump
Songs about Donald Trump
Songs written by Snoop Dogg
Songs about clowns
Songs about police brutality
Empire Distribution singles